Belasica (Macedonian and Bulgarian: , also translit. Belasitsa or Belasitza, Ottoman Turkish: بلش Turkish: Beleş), Belles (Bélles) or Kerkini (Kerkíni;), is a mountain range in the region of Macedonia in Southeastern Europe, shared by northeastern Greece (about 45%), southeastern North Macedonia (35%) and southwestern Bulgaria (20%).

Geography
The highest point is Radomir (Kalabaka) at 2,031 m, with elevation otherwise ranging between 300 and 1900 m above sea level. The borders of all three countries meet at Tumba Peak. The climate in the area shows strong Mediterranean influence.

The area of Belasica became a euroregion in 2003. Two football teams are named after the mountain range, PFC Belasitsa from the nearby Bulgarian town of Petrich and FC Belasica from Strumica in North Macedonia.

History
Since ancient times Greeks refer to the range as Ὄρβηλος (Modern Greek: ,). According to the ancient authors it was a mountain range in the border area between Thrace and Macedonia. It is generally equated today with the modern Belasica. The name Órbēlos is probably derived from the ancient Thracian/Paionian toponym of the mountain, which means "shining mountain", from belos – "blazing" or "shining", and or – "mountain". It was known for its Dionysos cult. 

The area is also particularly famous for the Battle of Kleidion of 1014, which proved crucial for the fall of the First Bulgarian Empire.

Honour
Kongur Glacier on Smith Island, South Shetland Islands is named after the peak and nature reserve of Kongur on Belasitsa Mountain.

Photo gallery

See also
Belasitsa Nature Park
Smolare Falls

References
 Belasitsa. Tourist map, Sofia, 2006.
 Благоевъ, Т. А. Бѣласица. София, 1925.
 Динчев, Евг., Атанасов, П. Високите планини на Република Македония. Пътеводител, София, 1998, стр. 214–224.
 "Енциклопедия Пирински край". Том 1, Благоевград, 1995, стр. 78.

References

External links

 Belasitsa.com (regional portal)
 Image Gallery From Belasica 

Rhodope mountain range
Mountain ranges of Greece
Mountain ranges of North Macedonia
Mountain ranges of Bulgaria
Landforms of Blagoevgrad Province
Geography of Macedonia (region)
Bulgaria–Greece border
Bulgaria–North Macedonia border
Greece–North Macedonia border
International mountains of Europe
Landforms of Kilkis (regional unit)
Landforms of Serres (regional unit)
Landforms of Central Macedonia